Ballack may refer to:

 Michael Ballack (born 1976), retired German footballer
 Ballack (footballer, born 1987) (born 1987), Cape Verde footballer
 Sainey Touray (born 1990), known as Ballack, Gambian footballer
 Luís Germano Pires Lopes de Almeida (born 1990), known as Kiki Ballack, Cape Verde footballer